The canton of Saint-Jean-de-Maurienne is an administrative division of the Savoie department, southeastern France. Its borders were modified at the French canton reorganisation which came into effect in March 2015. Its seat is in Saint-Jean-de-Maurienne.

It consists of the following communes:

Albiez-le-Jeune
Albiez-Montrond
La Chambre
La Chapelle
Les Chavannes-en-Maurienne
Fontcouverte-la-Toussuire
Jarrier
Montricher-Albanne
Montvernier
Notre-Dame-du-Cruet
Saint-Alban-des-Villards
Saint-Avre
Saint-Colomban-des-Villards
Sainte-Marie-de-Cuines
Saint-Étienne-de-Cuines
Saint-François-Longchamp
Saint-Jean-d'Arves
Saint-Jean-de-Maurienne
Saint-Julien-Mont-Denis
Saint-Martin-sur-la-Chambre
Saint-Pancrace
Saint-Rémy-de-Maurienne
Saint-Sorlin-d'Arves
La Tour-en-Maurienne
Villarembert
Villargondran

References

Cantons of Savoie